is a Japanese former football player.

Playing career
Komine was born in Higashimatsuyama on April 25, 1974. After graduating from Juntendo University, he joined the Japan Football League club Tokyo Gas (later FC Tokyo) in 1998. He played many matches as center back with Sandro during the first season. However his opportunity to play decreased behind Tetsuya Ito and Teruyuki Moniwa from 2002. In August 2003, he moved to Vegalta Sendai and played many matches. In 2004, he moved to Kashiwa Reysol. However he could hardly play in the match. In 2005, he moved to the J2 club Tokushima Vortis. He played many matches as center back for the first time in four years. In 2006, he moved to the Regional Leagues club FC Gifu. He played many matches over three seasons and the club was promoted to the Japan Football League in 2007 and J2 in 2008. He retired at the end of the 2008 season.

Club statistics

References

External links

1974 births
Living people
Juntendo University alumni
Association football people from Saitama Prefecture
Japanese footballers
J1 League players
J2 League players
Japan Football League (1992–1998) players
Japan Football League players
FC Tokyo players
Vegalta Sendai players
Kashiwa Reysol players
Tokushima Vortis players
FC Gifu players
Association football defenders